Episkopi Gonias also Mesa Gonia is a village and a community on the island of Santorini in Greece, located 6 km southeast of the capital Fira.
It is built on the foothills of Profitis Ilias mountain and had 118 inhabitants according to the 2011 census. Episkopi Gonias was almost entirely destroyed by an earthquake in 1956. As a result, most of its dwellers moved near the coast and built the village of Kamari. Today, Episkopi Gonias and Kamari comprise the community (Δημοτική Κοινότητα) of Episkopi Gonias with a total population of 1,462 (2011).

The village derives its name from Panagia Episkopi, a nearby 11th century Byzantine church which used to be the seat of the Orthodox diocese of Santorini.

References

Santorini
Populated places in Thira (regional unit)